The 2012–13 Mount St. Mary's Mountaineers men's basketball team represented Mount St. Mary's University during the 2012–13 NCAA Division I men's basketball season. The Mountaineers, led by first year head coach Jamion Christian, played their home games at Knott Arena and were members of the Northeast Conference. They finished the season 18–14, 11–7 in NEC play to finish in a tie for fifth place. They advanced to the championship game of the Northeast Conference tournament where they lost to Long Island. Despite the 18 wins, they did not participate in a postseason tournament.

Roster

Schedule

|-
!colspan=9| Regular season

|-
!colspan=9| 2013 Northeast Conference men's basketball tournament

References

Mount St. Mary's Mountaineers men's basketball seasons
Mount St. Mary's